Enrique Martínez Heredia (born 27 January 1953 in Huesa) is a Spanish former road bicycle racer. He won the young rider classification in the 1976 Tour de France. As an amateur he won the Tour de l'Avenir. He also won the Volta a Catalunya in 1976 and the Spanish National Road Race Championship in 1978.

External links

 

1953 births
Spanish male cyclists
Living people
Spanish Vuelta a España stage winners
Sportspeople from the Province of Jaén (Spain)
Cyclists from Andalusia